Enfield Primary Care NHS Trust was an English National Health Service Primary Care Trust (PCT) responsible for health care in Enfield, in North London which was abolished in April 2013.

It was co-terminous with Enfield Borough, having, like other London PCTs escaped reorganisation in the 2006 reconfiguration of primary care in the UK. It comes within the remit of NHS London strategic health authority.

Two NHS hospitals are located in the trust's area: Chase Farm Hospital in the north, and North Middlesex University Hospital in the south-east. This relative 'overprovision' of hospital facilities in the area, especially given the proximity of the larger London teaching hospitals, is an underlying factor in the financial problems which have troubled the trust. The trust is seeking to assist reconfiguration of facilities, including a transfer of provision from hospitals to the community, in line with the policy of the Blair and Brown governments. However, since 2006 local newspapers, politicians and MPs have attacked plans to reduce services at Chase Farm. which has impeded the proposed changes. In 2008 Enfield Council referred the changes to an Independent Review Panel, which broadly endorsed them in its report of September 2008.

The trust also faced significant health inequalities in its area due to demographic differences. The high proportion of ethnic minority populations, and poorer quality of housing, in the south and east of Enfield means that life expectancy in these areas is up to 8 years shorter than for the wealthier area in north-west Enfield.

The Trust held monthly board meetings which are open for the public to attend.

See also
 Francis Crick Institute
 Healthcare in London
 List of NHS trusts

References
Enfield 2005-06 Public Health Report

Defunct NHS trusts
Health in the London Borough of Enfield